The Dutch Catholic Trade Union Federation (NKV) was a national trade union centre bringing together Catholic trade unions in the Netherlands.

The federation was established in 1925, as the Roman Catholic Workers' Federation.  It disbanded in 1941, but was reformed in 1945, as the Catholic Workers' Movement.  In 1964, it became the NKV, with nine affiliated trade unions.  In 1976, it merged with the Dutch Confederation of Trade Unions, to form the Federation of Dutch Trade Unions, although it was not formally dissolved until 1981.

Presidents
1925: A. C. de Bruijn
1952: Toon Middelhuis
1964: Jan Mertens

Affiliates

References

1925 establishments in the Netherlands
1981 disestablishments
Catholic trade unions
National trade union centers of the Netherlands
Trade unions established in 1925
Trade unions disestablished in 1981